Blackjack Master is a 1981 video game published by Hayden Books.

Gameplay
Blackjack Master is a game in which the player has a bankroll of $100,000 USD for blackjack.

Reception
Richard McGrath reviewed the game for Computer Gaming World, and stated that "if you're a reasonably capable programmer and an avid blackjack player, then this program may be your guidebook on the road to riches."

References

External links
in Interface Age

1981 video games